Pandebono or pan de bono is a type of Colombian bread made of cassava starch, cheese, eggs, and in some regions of the country, guava jam. Traditionally, it is consumed with hot chocolate, still warm a few minutes after baking. It is very popular in the Colombian department of Valle del Cauca. This bread can be made in both a round and a ring shape.

Etymology
It is said that an Italian baker who lived in the Colombian city of Cali baked the bread and every afternoon went out to sell them, yelling “pane del buono” in the streets. This is how the name became popular.

Another version documented by Edouard André in his article “América Equinoccial” published in “América Pintoresca” says that the name came from a site on the road between Dagua and Cali called “Hacienda El Bono” where the product was originally made. Thus, the inhabitants of the region used to buy it and referred to it as “Pan del Bono” meaning “Bread from El Bono” and by the continued use the name was abbreviated as “Pandebono”.

Still another version states that the name comes from the voucher (Spanish “bono”) the workers from the region's sugar cane farms received as part of their compensation, which could be exchanged for bread. Therefore, the name would mean “voucher bread”.

See also
 Colombian cuisine
 List of breads
 Pan de yuca
 Pão de queijo

References
 América Pintoresca, Montaner y Simon, 1884, vol. 3, pp. 704 

Colombian cuisine
Cassava dishes
Latin American breads
Guava dishes
Cheese dishes